Shmuel  "Sam" Vaknin (born April 21, 1961) is an Israeli writer and professor of psychology. He is the author of Malignant Self Love: Narcissism Revisited (1999), was the last editor-in-chief of the now-defunct political news website Global Politician, and runs a private website about narcissistic personality disorder (NPD). He has also postulated a theory on chronons and time asymmetry.

Background

Early life 

Vaknin was born in Kiryat Yam, Israel, the eldest of five children born to Sephardi Jewish immigrants. Vaknin's mother was from Turkey, and his father, a construction worker, was from Morocco. He describes a difficult childhood, in which he writes that his parents "were ill-equipped to deal with normal children, let alone the gifted".

He left home to serve in the Israel Defense Forces from 1979 to 1982 in training and education units. Between 1980 and 1983 he founded a chain of computerized information kiosks in Tel Aviv, and in 1982 worked for the Nessim D. Gaon Group in Geneva, Paris, and New York City. 

In the mid-1980s, he became aware of difficulties in his relationship with his fiancée, and that he had mood swings. In 1985 he sought help from a psychiatrist, who diagnosed him with narcissistic personality disorder (NPD). Vaknin did not accept the diagnosis at the time. 

From 1986 to 1987 he was the general manager of IPE Ltd. in London. He moved back to Israel, where he became director of an Israeli investment firm, Mikbatz Teshua. He was also president of the Israeli chapter of the Unification Church's Professors for World Peace Academy.

Arrest and imprisonment 
In Israel in 1995 he was found guilty on three counts of securities fraud along with two other men, Nissim Avioz and Dov Landau. He was sentenced to 18 months' imprisonment and fined 50,000 shekels (about $14,000), while the company was fined 100,000 shekels. In 1996, as a condition of parole, he agreed to a mental health evaluation, which noted various personality disorders. According to Vaknin, "I was borderline, schizoid, but the most dominant was NPD," and on this occasion he accepted the diagnosis, because, he wrote, "it was a relief to know what I had."

Later life 
Vaknin moved to Skopje, Republic of Macedonia (now North Macedonia), where he married Macedonian Lidija Rangelovska. They set up Narcissus Publications in 1997, which publishes Vaknin's work. Between 2001 and 2003, Vaknin was a Senior Business Correspondent for United Press International. He has also written for Central Europe Review about political issues in the Balkans, as well as for the Middle East Times. Until a few weeks before the September 2002 Macedonian election, he served as an adviser to Macedonia's Ministry of Finance. He writes regularly for other publications, such as the International Analyst Network, and the online American Chronicle.

Vaknin is visiting professor at Southern Federal University in Rostov Oblast, Russia in 2017–22 holding a course of lectures there on personality theory in psychology. He is also a professor of finance and a professor of psychology in the Centre for International Advanced and Professional Studies (CIAPS) in Nigeria.

Writing and interviews

Work on chronons and time asymmetry 
A model of quantised time was proposed by Vaknin in his 1982 Ph.D. dissertation, titled "Time Asymmetry Revisited". The dissertation was published by Pacific Western University (California). The dissertation submitted postulates the existence of a particle (chronon). In the proposed theory, time is the result of the interaction of chronons, very much as other forces in nature are the result of other particle interactions. Vaknin postulates the existence of various time quarks (up, down, colors, etc.) whose properties cancel each other and thus the arrow of time is derived (time asymmetry). The postulated particle (chronon) is not only an ideal clock, but also mediates time itself (analogous to the relationship between the Higgs boson and mass).  In other words, what we call "time" is the interaction between chronons in a field. Chronons exchange between them a particle and thereby exert a force. "Events" are perturbations in the Time Field and they are distinct from chronon interactions. Chronon interactions (particle exchanges) in the Time Field generate "time" and "time asymmetry" as we observe them.

Views on narcissism
Vaknin has a prolific online presence, writing on narcissism and psychopathy. His views have been solicited by the media.

In his view, narcissists have lost their "true self", the core of their personality, which has been replaced by delusions of grandeur, a "false self". Therefore, he believes, they cannot be healed, because they do not exist as real persons, only as reflections: "The False Self replaces the narcissist's True Self and is intended to shield him from hurt and narcissistic injury by self-imputing omnipotence…  The narcissist pretends that his False Self is real and demands that others affirm this confabulation," meanwhile keeping his real-life imperfect true self under wraps. Vaknin extends the concept of narcissistic supply, and introduces concepts such as primary and secondary narcissistic supply. He distinguishes between cerebral and somatic narcissists; the former generate their narcissistic supply by applying their minds, the latter their bodies. He considers himself a cerebral narcissist. He calls narcissistic co-dependents "inverted narcissists."  "[They] provide the narcissist with an obsequious, unthreatening audience… the perfect backdrop." He believes that disproportionate numbers of pathological narcissists are at work in the most influential reaches of society, such as medicine, finance and politics.

Vaknin developed a new treatment modality for narcissism and depression, dubbed "Cold Therapy".  It is based on recasting pathological narcissism as a form of CPTSD (Complex Post-traumatic Stress Disorder) and arrested development which result in an addictive personality with a dysfunctional attachment style. The therapy uses re-traumatization and a form of reframing.

Film appearances
In 2007, Vaknin appeared in the episode "Egomania" of the British Channel 4 documentary series Mania. 

In 2009, he was the subject of an Australian documentary film, I, Psychopath, directed by Ian Walker. In the film, Vaknin underwent a psychological evaluation in which he met the criteria for psychopathy according to the Hare Psychopathy Checklist, but did not meet the criteria for narcissism.

In 2016, Vaknin appeared in the documentary How Narcissists Took Over the World produced by Vice Media.

In 2019, Vaknin appeared in the online documentary "Plugged-in: The True Toxicity of Social Media Revealed" produced by Richard Grannon.

Selected publications
 Requesting my Loved One (Bakasha me-Isha Ahuva) published by Yedioth Aharonot Miskal, Tel-Aviv, 1997
 (with Nikola Gruevski) Macedonian Economy on a Crossroads. Skopje, NIP Noval Literatura, 1998. 
Malignant Self Love: Narcissism Revisited. Narcissus Publications, Prague, 1999. 
After the Rain: How the West Lost the East. Narcissus Publications, in association with Central Europe Review/CEENMI, 2000.

See also
 Malignant narcissism
 Narcissistic abuse
 Narcissistic rage and narcissistic injury

References

External links

Free e-books and anthologies of essays by Sam Vaknin
Academic papers, conference presentations, and media interviews by Sam Vaknin 
University of Pennsylvania Online Books Page online books by Sam Vaknin
Sam Vaknin's books in the Library of Congress

1961 births
Living people
Israeli journalists
Israeli non-fiction writers
Israeli poets
Israeli expatriates in North Macedonia
Narcissism writers
People with narcissistic personality disorder
Israeli people of Sephardi descent
People from Kiryat Yam